William Talbot (1658 – 10 October 1730) was an English Anglican bishop. He was Bishop of Oxford from 1699 to 1715, Bishop of Salisbury from 1715 to 1722 and Bishop of Durham from 1722 to 1730.

Life
The son of William Talbot of Lichfield, by his wife Mary, daughter of Thomas Stoughton of Whittington, Worcestershire, he was born at Stourton Castle, Staffordshire, around 1659. On 28 March 1674 he matriculated as a gentleman commoner at Oriel College, Oxford, and graduated B.A. on 16 October 1677, and M.A. on 23 June 1680.

Talbot's first preferment was the rectory of Burghfield, Berkshire (1682), a living in the gift of his kinsman, Charles Talbot, 1st Duke of Shrewsbury. The deanery of Worcester was vacant after the deprivation of George Hickes as a nonjuror, and Shrewsbury's interest secured the appointment of Talbot in April 1691. Hickes drew up a protest (2 May) claiming a "legal right", which he affixed to the entrance to the choir of Worcester Cathedral. John Tillotson then gave Talbot (8 June) a Lambeth degree of D.D.

In 1699 Talbot succeeded John Hough as bishop of Oxford (consecrated 24 September), retaining his deanery in commendam; he had been made D.D. of Oxford on 8 August. In the debate in the House of Lords following the trial (1710) of Henry Sacheverell, he was one of four bishops who spoke for his condemnation. His charge of 1712 maintained the validity of lay baptism against Roger Laurence. In 1718 he was made Dean of the Chapel Royal. On 23 April 1715 he was translated to the see of Salisbury, and resigned the deanery of Worcester.

At Salisbury, through his son Edward Talbot, he was brought into connection with Thomas Rundle, Joseph Butler, and Thomas Secker, all of whom he helped by his patronage. On the death of Nathaniel Crew Talbot was translated (12 October 1721) to the see of Durham. There he became unpopular by promoting (February 1723) a bill empowering bishops to grant new mining leases without the consent of chapters. The bill was emasculated in the House of Commons, but Talbot in course of time managed the chapter through prebendaries of his appointment. He incurred further unpopularity by advancing the fines on his own leases and commending the example to the chapter. His profuse expenditure kept him short of money.

Talbot died in Hanover Square, London, on 10 October 1730, and was buried on 14 October in St. James's, Westminster.

Works
Talbot published single sermons (1691–1717), his speech in the Lords on the Sacheverell case (1710), two charges (1712–17), and a circular to the Salisbury clergy directing collections for Moravians (1716). His volume of Twelve Sermons (1725 and 1731) follows the theology of Samuel Clarke.

Family
Talbot had two sisters, Frances Talbot and Catherine Talbot. His father was a descendant of Sir Gilbert Talbot and Elizabeth Knollys.

He married, first, a daughter of Crispe, an attorney at Chipping Norton, Oxfordshire, who died without issue; secondly, Catharine (d. 23 Nov. 1730), daughter of Alderman Richard King of London, by whom he had eight sons and several daughters. The sons included:

Charles Talbot, 1st Baron Talbot (c. 1685 - 1737)
Edward Talbot (c. 1693 - 1720), Archdeacon of Berkshire. He married Mary (d. 1784), daughter of George Martyn, prebendary of Lincoln;  Catherine Talbot was their daughter.
Major-General Sherrington Talbot (c. 1699 - ?), father of Sir Charles Henry Talbot, 1st Baronet (see Talbot Baronets).

Their daughter, Henrietta Maria, married Charles Trimnell, bishop of Winchester.

Notes

Attribution
 

1658 births
1730 deaths
People from Lichfield
People from Burghfield
Deans of Worcester
Deans of the Chapel Royal
Bishops of Durham
Bishops of Oxford
Bishops of Salisbury
Lord-Lieutenants of Durham
18th-century Church of England bishops
William
Chancellors of the Order of the Garter
17th-century Anglican theologians
18th-century Anglican theologians